Ardabil Provincial League is the premier football league of Ardabil Province and is 5th in the Iranian football pyramid after the 3rd Division. It is part of the Vision Asia program.

Teams 2012-13
In total, 10 teams competed in the 2012-13 season.

Dorostkaran Maghan
Esteghlal Parsabad
Ghandomkaran 
Abozar Parsabad
Shahid 
Golshahr Niman
Zob Ahan Ardabil
Dahiari
Esteghlal Sarein
Shahid Tiraglu
Keshavarz Alni

References

Sport in Ardabil Province
5